Goose Lane Editions is a Canadian book publishing company founded in 1954 in Fredericton, New Brunswick as Fiddlehead Poetry Books by Fred Cogswell and a group of students and faculty from the University of New Brunswick associated with The Fiddlehead.  After Cogswell retired in 1981, his successor, Peter Thomas, changed the name to Goose Lane Editions. From 1989 to 1997 Douglas Lochhead was president of Goose Lane. It is now headed by publisher and co-owner Susanne Alexander. The Canada Council for the Arts says the publishing company "has evolved to become one of Canada's most exciting showcases of home-grown literary talent."

Publications from Goose Lane Editions include literary fiction, poetry, biographies, works of history, travel literature, outdoor travel guides and serious non-fiction, as well as fine art volumes that it often publishes in association with museums and galleries. Authors published by Goose Lane include Alden Nowlan, Nancy Bauer, Herb Curtis, Reg Balch, Lynn Coady, Alan Cumyn, Sheree Fitch, Kerry Clare, Jeffery Donaldson, Herménégilde Chiasson, Lynn Davies, Tammy Armstrong, Kathryn Kuitenbrouwer, Catherine Bush, Noah Richler, Jacques Poitras, Tamai Kobayashi, Douglas Glover whose novel Elle won the 2003 Governor General's Award for English-language fiction, Joan Thomas whose novel Reading by Lightning won the 2009 Commonwealth Writers Prize for Best First Book (Canada and the Caribbean), Riel Nason whose novel The Town That Drowned won the 2012 Commonwealth Book Prize (Canada and Europe), and Marcello Di Cintio, whose book Walls: Travels Along the Barricades won the 2013 Shaughnessy Cohen Award for Political Writing.

Executive
 Carmelita Thompson O'Neill, Chair of the Board of Directors
 Susanne Alexander, President and Publisher
 Julie Scriver, Vice-President and Creative Director

References

External links
 Goose Lane Editions official website

Book publishing companies of Canada
Small press publishing companies
Publishing companies established in 1954
Companies based in Fredericton
Museum companies